
Michael Ryan (born 1953, Cork) is an Irish Michelin star winning head chef and hotel-owner in Cork, Ireland. In the period 1971-1999 he and his family were owners of the Michelin star winning Arbutus Lodge.

Following in the footsteps of his older brother Declan, Ryan did a part of his chef training abroad, working in France with Paul Bocuse in Lyon and the Troisgros family in Roanne. Afterwards, he worked as chef and head chef in Arbutus Lodge, till its closure in 1999.

He opened Isaacs Restaurant with his wife Catherine Ryan and their business partner Canice Sharky (formerly of Ballymaloe) in 1992.

Personal
Michael Ryan is the younger brother of Declan Ryan, former head chef and now artisan baker.

Awards
 Michelin Star Arbutus Lodge: 1974-1983 & 1986-1987

References 

1953 births
Living people
Irish chefs
Head chefs of Michelin starred restaurants